The Mark of the Skunk (Spanish:La marca del zorrillo) is a 1950 Mexican comedy film directed by Gilberto Martínez Solares and starring Germán Valdés, Silvia Pinal and Marcelo Chávez.

The film's sets were designed by Manuel Fontanals.

Cast
 Germán Valdés as Tin / El vizconde de Texmelucan  
 Silvia Pinal as Lupita  
 Marcelo Chávez as Don Marcelo de Toluca, el gobernador 
 Rafael Alcayde as Capitán don Gaspar de Cadereyta  
 Hortensia Constance as Doña Leonor de Tijuana  
 Juan García as Pitaya  
 Lupe Inclán as La bruja  
 Rafael Banquells as Oficial  
 José René Ruiz as Enano  
 Joaquín García Vargas as Cocinero 
 Gregorio Acosta as Guardia  
 Stephen Berne as Cliente posada  
 Magdalena Estrada as Clienta posada 
 José Luis Fernández as Cliente posada  
 Emilio Garibay as Guardia 
 Leonor Gómez as Clienta posada  
 Regino Herrera as Guardia  
 Araceli Julián as Cantante  
 Elena Julián as Cantante  
 Rosalía Julián as Cantante  
 José Ortega as Guardia  
 Joaquín Roche as Notario  
 Humberto Rodríguez 
 Ángela Rodríguez as Invitada a fiesta  
 Guillermina Téllez Girón as Invitada fiesta  
 Manuel 'Loco' Valdés as Empleado  
 Ramón Valdés as Guardia  
 Hernán Vera as Posadero

References

Bibliography 
 Carlos Monsiváis & John Kraniauskas. Mexican Postcards. Verso, 1997.

External links 
 

1950 films
1950 comedy films
Mexican comedy films
1950s Spanish-language films
Films directed by Gilberto Martínez Solares
1950s parody films
Mexican black-and-white films
1950s Mexican films